Obsesión (Spanish "obsession") or plural Obsesiones, may refer to:

Film and TV
Obsesión (telenovela), 1967 telenovela
Obsesión (1996 TV series), (es) featuring Santiago Magill, Gianella Neyra, Diego Bertie, Carlos Alcántara Vilar, Christian Meier
Obsesión (2005 TV series), (es) featuring Mario Casas, Cristina Peña
Obsesión de venganza  1987 film
Obsesión, 2004 short film nominated at Spain's 14th Goya Awards 2004
Obsesión 2010 filmography Scott Shaw

Music
Obsesión (Mexican band), Monterrey band with which Myriam Montemayor Cruz sung
Obsesión (Cuban band) hip hop duo
Obsesión, classical composition by Jesús Rueda (composer) 2004

Albums
Obsesión (Los Freddys album), Mexico 1969
Obsesión (Sangre Azul album), Spain
Obsesión (Miguel Mateos album), Argentina
Obsesión (Daniela Castillo album), Chile 2006
Obsesión, album by Los Palominos 2000 Latin Grammy Award for Best Tejano Album
Obsesiones, 12th album by Mexican pop singer Yuri 1992

Songs

Obsesión (Pedro Flores song) "Por alto que esté el cielo", 1935, covered by Los Freddys, Spanish Harlem Orchestra, Julio Iglesias, and others
Obsesión (Aventura song) "Son las cinco de la manana y yo no he dormido nada", 2003, covered by Freddy J, Lucenzo (Tropical Family)
"Obsesión", song by Los Palominos ("No se como has podido tu entrar al fondo de mi alma") from  Obsesión (Los Palaminos album)
"Obsesión", single from Obsesión (Sangre Azul album)
"Obsesión", single from Obsesión (Miguel Mateos album) "Tan sólo dime que me amas", covered by Jennifer Batten, Mayré Martínez
"Obsesión", single from Obsesión (Daniela Castillo album) "Quiero ser la danza dentro de tu mente"
"Obsesión", song by Delirious? from Libertad (Delirious? album), rewritten by Martin Smith from English original "Obsession"
"Obsesión", song by Mexican pop singer Ana Gabriel "Te quiero ver Ya no dejo de pensar en ti" from album Soy como soy 
"Obsesión", song by Magneto from Siempre (Magneto album) "Estoy tirado en un sillón me aburre la televisión"
"Obsesión", song by Argentinian singer-songwriter Alejandro Lerner from Enojado 2007
"Obsesión", song from Lorena Herrera album Sobrevivire 2003

See also
Obsession (disambiguation)